Northland Shopping Centre is a major shopping centre in Preston, approximately 11 km north of the Melbourne Central Business District in Victoria. It is the largest predominantly single-level shopping centre in Melbourne. It has more than 330 stores all spread over one floor apart from the cinemas and Pancake Parlour on a smaller top level.

The centre is anchored by a Myer department store (4 levels), Target and Kmart department stores, Coles, Woolworths and Aldi supermarkets, as well as mini majors Best & Less, JB Hi-Fi, Rebel Sport, TK Maxx and Chemist Warehouse, international brands H&M, Uniqlo and Sephora, and a Hoyts Cinema complex.

History
Opening on Tuesday, 4 October 1966, Northland Shopping Centre was one of the first self-contained shopping centres in Melbourne. The shopping centre was built and owned by the Myer Emporium. The original shopping centre consisted of 3 malls radiating north, east and west from a centre stage area.  It housed 73 tenants and 6 professional suites.  Some of the original retailers included Myer, Coles New World Supermarket, Buckley and Nunn Department Store, McEwans, Woolworths Variety Store and Coles Variety Store.  A feature of the shopping centre was the Northland Market located at the south-west end of the shopping centre.

In July 1983, the Myer Emporium sold the shopping centre to the Gandel Group of Companies. It is currently owned 50:50 by GPT and Vicinity Group.

Legionnaires Scare
In early 2006 Northland shopping centre was one of 7 buildings suspected of harbouring legionnaires disease after an outbreak which killed one and infected 7 others in the area. Subsequent investigation by the Coroner - Dr Jane Hendtlass (Case No 729/06) confirmed that alleged buildings nearby did not contain the disease.

Gallery

References

Notes
Northland Redevelopment Newsletter-June 2008 http://cms.cfspm.com.au/Assets/Files/NorthlandDevelopmentNewsletterJune.pdf

External links

Shopping centres in Melbourne
Shopping malls established in 1966
Buildings and structures in the City of Darebin
1966 establishments in Australia